Algoriphagus is a genus in the phylum Bacteroidota (Bacteria).

Etymology
The name Algoriphagus derives from:Latin masculine gender noun algor -oris, cold; Greek masculine gender noun , glutton; New Latin masculine gender noun Algoriphagus, the cold eater.

Species
The genus contains 46 validly described species as of 2020 as indicated in the List of Names with Standing in Prokaryote Nomenclature (LPSN.dmz.de). Some of these species are listed below
 A. alkaliphilus ( (Tiago et al. 2006) Nedashkovskaya et al. 2007, ; New Latin noun  (from Arabic article al, the; Arabic noun , ashes of saltwort, soda), alkali; New Latin adjective  from Greek adjective  meaning friend, loving; New Latin feminine gender adjective , loving alkaline environments.)
 A. antarcticus ( Van Trappen et al. 2004, ; Latin masculine gender adjective , southern, of the Antarctic, the environment from where the strains were isolated.)
 A. aquatilis ( Liu et al. 2009, ; Latin masculine gender adjective , aquatic, pertaining to the isolation of the type strain from fresh water.)
 A. aquimarinus ( Nedashkovskaya et al. 2004, ; Latin feminine gender noun , water; Latin masculine gender adjective , marine, of the sea; New Latin masculine gender adjective , of sea water.)
 A. boritolerans ( (Ahmed et al. 2007) Nedashkovskaya et al. 2007, ; New Latin noun , boron; Latin participle adjective , tolerating; New Latin participle adjective , boron-tolerating.)
 A. chordae ( Nedashkovskaya et al. 2004, ; New Latin genitive case noun chordae, of Chorda, the generic name of the brown alga Chorda filum, from which the type strain was isolated.)
 A. halophilus ( (Yi and Chun 2004) Nedashkovskaya et al. 2004, ; Greek noun hals, halos (ἅλς, ἁλός), salt; New Latin adjective philus from Greek adjective philos (φίλος) meaning friend, loving; New Latin masculine gender adjective halophilus, salt-loving.)
 A. hitonicola ( Copa-Patiño et al. 2008, ; New Latin noun , El Hito lagoon; Latin suff. -, inhabitant, dweller; New Latin noun , inhabitant of El Hito.)
 A. locisalis ( Yoon et al. 2005, ; Latin noun , place, locality; Latin genitive case noun , of salt; New Latin genitive case noun , of a place of salt.)
 A. lutimaris ( Park et al. 2010, ; Latin noun , mud; Latin genitive case noun , of the sea; New Latin genitive case noun , of a marine mud.)
 A. machipongonensis ( Alegado et al. 2012, ; Algonquin noun "Machipongo", Hog Island, Virginia, USA; Latin suff. -ensis, of or belonging to; New Latin  masculine gender "", of or belonging to Machipongo/Hog Island).
 A. mannitolivorans ( (Yi and Chun 2004) Nedashkovskaya et al. 2007, ; New Latin neuter gender noun mannitolum, mannitol; Latin participle adjective vorans, devouring; New Latin participle adjective mannitolivorans, mannitol-devouring, utilizing mannitol.)
 A. marincola ( (Yoon et al. 2004) Nedashkovskaya et al. 2007, ; Latin noun mare -is, the sea; Latin noun , inhabitant; New Latin noun , inhabitant of the sea.)
 A. olei ( Young et al. 2009, ; Latin genitive case neuter gender noun , of/from oil, as the type strain was isolated from oil-contaminated soil.)
 A. ornithinivorans ( (Yi and Chun 2004) Nedashkovskaya et al. 2007, ; New Latin neuter gender noun , ; Latin participle adjective vorans, devouring; New Latin participle adjective ornithinivorans, ornithine-devouring, utilizing ornithine.)
 A. ratkowskyi ( Bowman et al. 2003,  (Type species of the genus).; New Latin genitive case masculine gender noun , of Ratkowsky, in honour of David A. Ratkowsky, who made significant contributions to growth-modelling of bacteria, including psychrophilic bacteria.)
 A. terrigena ( Yoon et al. 2006, ; Latin masculine gender or feminine gender noun , child of the earth, referring to the isolation of the type strain from soil.)
 A. vanfongensis ( Nedashkovskaya et al. 2007, ; New Latin masculine gender adjective , of or pertaining to Vanfong Bay, from which the type strain was isolated.)
 A. winogradskyi ( Nedashkovskaya et al. 2004, ; New Latin genitive case masculine gender noun , of Winogradsky, to honour Sergey N. Winogradsky, for his contribution to the study of Cytophaga-like bacteria.)

See also
 Bacterial taxonomy
 Microbiology

References 

Bacteria genera
Cytophagia